Reuben W. Stroud (1841 in Lenox, Madison County, New York – December 2, 1875 in Syracuse, Onondaga County, New York) was an American civil engineer and politician from New York.

Life
He began his engineering career as assistant to John B. Jervis.

In 1870, he removed to Syracuse, NY, and was Chief Engineer on the construction of the Syracuse and Chenango Valley Railroad of which he became Superintendent after the construction was finished.

In 1872, he was elected a Canal Commissioner on the Republican ticket, and died a month before the end of his term.

He was married to Ella M. Bruce (1842-1919, daughter of Canal Commissioner Benjamin F. Bruce).

He died of typhoid fever at the Syracuse House in Syracuse, NY.

Sources
The Candidate for Canal Commissioner in NYT on August 24, 1872
 Editorial endorsing Stroud, in NYT on November 2, 1872
 Obit in NYT on December 3, 1875

1841 births
1875 deaths
People from Lenox, New York
Erie Canal Commissioners
American civil engineers
Politicians from Syracuse, New York
Deaths from typhoid fever
New York (state) Republicans
Engineers from New York (state)